Hanur is a town in Chamrajnagar district of Karnataka State, India.

Economy
Hanur is a commercial centre for many nearby villages like Ramapura, Lokkanahalli, Bylore, Odeyarpalya, Martalli, Ajjipura, Bandalli, Cowdalli, Mangala, Kamagere, and Singanalluru.

Education
 Eklavya Model Residential School

 Christa Raja School comprising Christa Raja School (English Medium), Christa Raja School (Kannada medium), Christa Raja PU College.
 Sri Vivekananda School of Hanur 
 Sri Vivekananda Composite PU college.
 G V Gowda High School and P U College
 B. Muniyappa Gowda High School (BMG)
 Morarji Desai Residential School
 Gowtham Vidya Samste
 LPS R.S.Doddi (Urdu), LPS R.S.Doddi (Kannada)

Natural Resources
Hanur is one of the wealthiest places of the Chamarajanagara district.  It is rich with natural resources like granite, agricultural products which include sugar cane, jowar and coconut.  The place is surrounded by hills and is located at the heart of the terrain. It has a rich culture with diversified people.

Tourism
It is the centre for famous tourist spots such as: 
 M. M. Hills (57 km from Hanur and 213 km from Bengaluru) 
 Hogenakkal Falls
 Mutthathi
 Tibet colony (Odeyara Palya)
 B. R. Hills
 Shivanasamudra Falls (Garanchukki and Barachukki)
 Nagamale
 Gundapur Dam
 Gundal Dam
 Mekedat

Transportation
Hanur is connected with Kollegala and Bengaluru, Mysore, chamrajnagara, shivamoga by Buses Karnataka State Road Transport Corporation by Hanur KSRTC bus stand. And SH 79 pass through this taluk  buses are available to Mysuru and Bengaluru . Karnataka State Road Transport Corporation buses also connects Coimbatore,salem, Mettur, erode by bus service.Devotees visiting Male Mahadeshwara Betta (MM hills) Hindu temple from Kollegala side take route via Hanur.

Temples and festivals
Hanur has Sri Bettalli Maramma Temple and Sri Mysuru Maramma Festival. The people celebrate this festival in March every year.

References

Cities and towns in Chamarajanagar district